Elasmias cernicum is a species of tropical, tree-living, air-breathing, land snail, arboreal pulmonate gastropod mollusk in the family Achatinellidae. This species is found in Mauritius and Réunion.

References

cernicum
Taxonomy articles created by Polbot